KVLY-TV (channel 11) is a television station in Fargo, North Dakota, United States, affiliated with NBC. It is owned by Gray Television alongside Horace-licensed low-power dual CBS/CW+ affiliate KXJB-LD (channel 30). Both stations share studios on 21st Avenue South in Fargo, while KVLY-TV's transmitter is located near Blanchard. In addition to its main studio in Fargo, KVLY-TV operates a news bureau and sales office in the US Bank building in downtown Grand Forks.

KVLY-TV is considered a part of the NBC North Dakota state network of NBC affiliates, although it airs separate newscasts and syndicated programming from flagship and sister station KFYR-TV in Bismarck.

The tower was at one time the tallest structure in the world and was the tallest broadcast structure in the Western Hemisphere. The KRDK-TV tower is located just  from the KVLY-TV tower, and now holds the record noted here.

History
The station signed on the air on October 11, 1959, as KXGO-TV (the "GO" for Fargo), an ABC affiliate. It was originally owned by North Dakota Broadcasting. In 1963, the call letters were changed to KEND-TV (for "Eastern North Dakota"). On August 13, 1963, channel 11 moved to its current tower near Blanchard. In 1964, the call letters were changed to as KTHI-TV (for "Tower-Hi"). Fuqua sold the station to Morgan Murphy Media (owner of KXLY-TV in Spokane, Washington) in 1968. On August 22, 1983, KTHI became an NBC affiliate, swapping affiliations with longtime NBC outlet WDAY-TV (channel 6). The current call sign, adopted on May 2, 1995, represents the station's slogan, "The Valley's Choice for Local News," as it serves the communities along the Red River of the North and its tributaries.

From 1968 until the mid-1980s, channel 11 was carried by cable systems across Manitoba and northwestern Ontario, including the Winnipeg area. When KTHI switched affiliation to NBC, it was replaced by ABC affiliate WDAZ-TV (channel 8) in Grand Forks, until Canadian cable companies were granted permission to replace most of the North Dakota stations with network affiliates from Detroit.

Meyer Broadcasting of Bismarck, North Dakota, owner of KFYR-TV in Bismarck and its network of satellites in western North Dakota, bought the station in 1995. It sold its television stations to Sunrise Television in 1997. In 2002, Sunrise sold its North Dakota stations to the Wicks Group of New York City. Hoak Media bought all of Wicks' television stations, including KVLY, in January 2007.

In September 2005, ten years after changing its call sign from KTHI, KVLY became the first major network affiliate in Fargo to broadcast in high-definition. In May 2006, KVLY made its logo bolder to reflect the change to HDTV. KVLY is the second-most-watched television station in the Red River Valley, behind WDAY/WDAZ, which are owned by Forum Communications Company.

In 2003, KVLY began operating CBS affiliate KXJB-TV under a local marketing agreement (LMA), and the two stations began sharing facilities. In April 2007, KVLY-TV and KXJB-TV began simulcasting weekend newscasts, and in November 2007, the stations began simulcasting news during weekdays rebranded as Valley News Live.

In January 2010, KVLY added classic movie network This TV to subchannel 11.2. It was replaced by classic television network MeTV on January 1, 2013.

On November 20, 2013, Hoak announced the sale of most of its stations, including KVLY-TV, to Gray Television. Sister station KXJB-TV was to be sold by Parker Broadcasting to Excalibur Broadcasting and would have continued to be operated by KVLY under an LMA. The sale was completed on June 13, but upon the closing of the sale, and in the wake of the new FCC rules restricting LMAs, Excalibur abandoned its plans to acquire the station.

Gray would continue to provide certain services to KXJB in the interim, and later moved its CBS programming to a multicast subchannel of KVLY. If a buyer was not found for KXJB, the station would cease broadcasting in the interim. KXJB would then be spun off to minority interests, which under this arrangement would allow the station to continue operating on the conditions that it operated independently (under minority, female and/or non-profit ownership) and not make any partnerships or sharing arrangements with other broadcasters.

On November 12, 2014, CBS affiliate KXJB-TV's programming began being simulcast on KVLY's second digital subchannel, displacing MeTV to the third subchannel, as KXJB was sold to Major Market Broadcasting. KXJB signed off at midnight on December 1, 2014, as its programming moved to KVLY's subchannel. KVLY-DT2 began simulcasting in full 1080i HD on KXJB-LD 30.1 in September 2016, along with translators K28MA-D 28.1 in Argusville (covering north and west of Fargo) and K30LR-D 30.1 in Grand Forks. CBS programming remains on KVLY-DT2 in downconverted 720p to provide full-market access to CBS in HD. KXJB-TV would return to the air as KRDK-TV in January 2015, carrying various networks on its subchannels.

On May 28, 2019, KVLY moved from UHF channel 44 to UHF channel 36.

Programming

Syndicated programming
Syndicated programming on KVLY includes Dr. Phil and Wheel of Fortune among others. Jeopardy!, which is paired with Wheel of Fortune in most markets, airs instead on CBS-affiliated sister station KXJB-LD; Fargo is one of the few markets where Jeopardy! and Wheel of Fortune are carried on separate stations.

Sports programming
KVLY has been home to North Dakota State Bison football games in recent years. The station broadcasts regular season games and produces a pregame show. In the 2019–2020 season the pregame show featured former NFL player and Bison alum Kyle Emanuel as one of the hosts.

News operation

Valley News Live is the name of the news department shared by KVLY and KXJB. KVLY and KXJB started simulcasting weekend news in April 2007. The same news is broadcast on both channels. KXJB uses its "4" digital on-screen graphic, while KVLY uses the "11" bug during newscasts. Beginning November 5, 2007, KVLY and KXJB expanded their simulcasting to weekdays.

KVLY broadcasts 26 hours of locally produced newscasts each week (with five hours each weekday, one hour on Saturdays and a half-hour on Sundays). It also broadcasts an additional 13 hours of locally produced newscasts each week for KVLY-DT 11.2 and KXJB-LD 30.1 and 30.2, consisting of the noon and 5:30 p.m. newscasts, an hour-long extension of KVLY's morning newscast The Valley Today at 7:00 a.m. on weekdays and a half-hour nightly prime time newscast at 9:00 p.m. Combined across the four channels, KVLY produces a total of 40 hours of newscasts each week.

Ratings
Recently, KVLY has been the ratings leader for the immediate Fargo–Moorhead metro area and the southern part of the market, however WDAZ's dominance in the Grand Forks metro area and the northern part of the market make the WDAY/WDAZ combo the ratings leader for the Fargo–Grand Forks market as a whole.

Due to many of KVLY's newscasts being simulcast on KXJB, KVLY and KXJB's ratings are combined. However, until recently, KVLY and KXJB were not counted as one station due to different network and syndicated programming. CBS and KXJB's programming moved to KVLY's second subchannel in December 2014 (and later KXJB-LD), therefore KVLY can now count all of its subchannels as one station for ratings purposes.

Former on-air staff
 Dennis Bounds – news anchor (later evening news anchor for KING 5 in Seattle; retired in 2016)
 Robert Ivers – news anchor and talk-show host; deceased
 Jim Lounsbury – news anchor (early 1980s; pioneer rock and roll DJ earlier in his career); deceased
 Ed Schultz – sports anchor (1982; was Fargo-based syndicated radio host); deceased

Technical information

Subchannels
The station's digital signal is multiplexed:

In January 2010, KVLY-TV began broadcasting the This TV network on subchannel 11.2. On January 1, 2013, This TV programming was replaced on digital channel 11.2 with its former sister network MeTV (both networks were owned at the time by Weigel Broadcasting; This TV was later taken over by Tribune Broadcasting and is now owned by Allen Media Group). In addition to the main MeTV programming, KVLY used the subchannel for live events (including NDSU Bison basketball), and to repeat its morning newscast, The Valley Today, in the late morning. On November 12, 2014, KXJB's programming was moved to KVLY's second digital subchannel (now also carried as KXJB-LD's main channel), displacing MeTV to the third. Heroes & Icons was added during November 2016 to KVLY's fourth subchannel, bringing a full-market coverage simulcast of KXJB-LD's third subchannel. KVLY's fourth subchannel was switched to Circle in 2021, while Heroes & Icons continues to be carried on KXJB-LD's third subchannel.

Analog-to-digital conversion

KVLY-TV shut down its analog signal, over VHF channel 11, on February 16, 2009, the day prior to the original date in which full-power television stations in the United States were set to transition from analog to digital broadcasts under federal mandate (which was later rescheduled for June 12, 2009). The station's digital signal remained on its pre-transition UHF channel 44. Through the use of Program and System Information Protocol, digital television receivers display the station's virtual channel as channel 11, its former VHF analog channel.

Translators
KVLY-TV serves its large coverage area with three translators. All are owned by local municipalities.

Active translators

Defunct translators

Some of the defunct translators were actually in the western part of the Minneapolis–Saint Paul, Minnesota, broadcast television market.

See also
 KVLY-TV mast

References

External links
 
  – MeTV Fargo

NBC network affiliates
MeTV affiliates
Gray Television
Television channels and stations established in 1959
Television stations in North Dakota
1959 establishments in North Dakota